Olympique de Marseille won Division 1 season 1970/1971 of the French Association Football League with 55 points.

Participating teams

 AC Ajaccio
 Angers SCO
 AS Angoulême
 SEC Bastia
 Bordeaux
 Olympique Lyonnais
 Olympique de Marseille
 FC Metz
 AS Nancy
 FC Nantes
 OGC Nice
 Nîmes Olympique
 Red Star Paris
 Stade de Reims
 Stade Rennais UC
 AS Saint-Etienne
 CS Sedan
 FC Sochaux-Montbéliard
 RC Strasbourg
 US Valenciennes-Anzin

League table

Promoted from Division 2, who will play in Division 1 season 1971/1972
 Lille OSC
 AS Monaco
 Paris Saint-Germain Football Club

Results

Top goalscorers

References

 Division 1 season 1970-1971 at pari-et-gagne.com

Ligue 1 seasons
French
1